Miroslav Ceplák (born 16 June 1983) is a Czech footballer who plays midfielder. He played for FK Žiar nad Hronom before moving to his current club FK Fotbal Třinec.

External links

Club profile

1983 births
Living people
Slovak footballers
Association football midfielders
FK Fotbal Třinec players